Caesar's Legions is a board wargame published by Avalon Hill in 1975 that simulates various Roman campaigns in Gaul and Germany.

Description
Caesar's Legions is a two-person game in which one player controls Roman Legions mounting incursions beyond the borders of the Roman Empire, and the other player controls opposing Gallic or Germanic tribes.

Components
The game includes:
22" x 28"" mounted hex grid map
 448 die-cut counters
 16-page rulebook 
 16 Tactical Cards
 various playing aids

Gameplay
Combat is resolved with a die roll that is cross-indexed on a Combat Results Table. However, the use of Tactical Cards may have an effect on the outcome.

Scenarios
The game comes with five historical scenarios:
 Caesar's Conquest of Gaul, 58 BCE 
Caesar's Crossing of the Rhine, 55 BCE
Teutoburger Wald: Quintillicus Varus walks into a trap, 9 CE 
Idistaviso: Drusus Germanicus attempts to recover the Eagles lost in the Teutoburger Wald, 15 CE
Batavian Revolt, 68 CE

Publication history
Loren Wiseman designed a game about the Battle of Idistaviso titled Eagles, which was published by Game Designer's Workshop in 1974. The following year, Avalon Hill acquired the rights to Eagles and Don Greenwood revised the rules significantly; this included changing the combat system to the one used in Avalon Hill's 1776, published the previous year. Greenwood also expanded the game to include four more scenarios. This expanded and revised game was titled Caesar's Legions, and was published in 1975.

In 1994, KP Games acquired the rights, and Keith Poulter expanded Caesar's Legions to include 32 scenarios and retitled the game Barbarians: 70 BC - 260 AD.

In 2010, Camelot Games acquired the rights and Craig Johnson designed an expansion to the original Caesar's Legions, which was titled Caesar in Gaul.

Reception
Richard Berg reviewed Eagles, the predecessor of Caesar's Legions, and called it "an interesting failure" that "has no playability to speak of." Berg chiefly objected to the game mechanics that allowed the German chieftains to avoid combat by hiding in the forest; if discovered by the Romans, they could simply flee to a different part of the forest. Berg did admit that the production values of the game were "heads above most" with "excellent clear graphics and well made counters [...] signs of the care and preparation put into this game." But he concluded with a thumbs down, saying, "Eagles is less of an eagle and more of a turkey."

In his 1977 book The Comprehensive Guide to Board Wargaming, Nick Palmer acknowledged that the first two scenarios of Caesar's Legions were easy enough to allow new players to learn the rules, but "Unfortunately the early scenarios are too simple for most tastes, and unbalanced in favour of the Romans. The later [scenarios], however, are absorbing and varied." He warned that "German play is always tricky, involving hit-and-run guerilla tactics." Palmer concluded that "it should appeal to anyone interested in the period, even if the Latin names are a trifle distorted at times!"

In the 1980 book The Complete Book of Wargames, game designer Jon Freeman thought the change of combat systems from the original one used in Eagles to the one used in 1776 was a questionable decision, "considering the absence of similarities in the two periods." Freeman also thought the rules revisions added "a great deal of unnecessary junk." He was disappointed in most of the scenarios, calling some of them "dull, simplistic and ahistorical", and the main scenario "a combination of hide-and-seek and ring-a-levio." He concluded by giving the game an Overall Evaluation of only "Fair", saying, "It's a lot of fire and effort, simulating nothing."

Other reviews and commentary
Fire & Movement #22
The Wargamer Vol.1 #1
Panzerfaust & Campaign #72

References

Avalon Hill games
Board wargames set in Ancient history
Wargames introduced in 1975